Ancherythroculter is a genus of cyprinid fishes that occur in eastern Asia in China and Vietnam.  There are currently five recognized species in this genus, though the validity of A. lini is under some doubt.

Species
There are currently five recognized species in this genus:
 Ancherythroculter daovantieni (Bănărescu, 1967)
 Ancherythroculter kurematsui (Sh. Kimura, 1934)
 Ancherythroculter lini Y. L. Luo, 1994 (may by jr. synonym of A. daovantieni)
 Ancherythroculter nigrocauda P. L. Yih & C. K. Wu, 1964
 Ancherythroculter wangi (T. L. Tchang, 1932)

References

Cyprinidae genera
Fish of Asia